The Latin Grammy Award for Best Alternative Music Album is an honor presented annually by the Latin Academy of Recording Arts & Sciences at the Latin Grammy Awards, a ceremony that recognizes excellence and promotes a wider awareness of cultural diversity and contributions of Latin recording artists in the United States and internationally. According to the category description guide for the 2012 Latin Grammy Awards, the award is for vocal or instrumental alternative albums containing at least 51 percent newly recorded material. It is awarded to solo artists, duos or groups.

Mexican artists have received this award more than any other nationality, though it has also been presented to artists originating from Colombia, the United States, and Venezuela. The award was first given to Mexican group Café Tacuba for the album Cuatro Caminos at the 5th Latin Grammy Awards ceremony held in 2004. The category is shared as the most wins with Café Tacuba, Natalia Lafourcade, Julieta Venegas and Aterciopelados with two wins each. The Mexican band Kinky with four nominations is the band with most nominations without a win.

Winners and nominees

2000s

2010s

2020s

Notes
 Each year is linked to the article about the Latin Grammy Awards held that year.
 The name of the performer and the nominated album.

References
General

Specific

External links
Official site of the Latin Grammy Awards

 
Awards established in 2004
Alternative Music Album